The Antim Cup is contested between the rugby union teams of Romania (The Oaks) and Georgia ("The Lelos"). It is named after the Metropolitan of Wallachia Anthim the Iberian, who was originally a Georgian.

The Antim Cup is contested each time Georgia and Romania meet in a senior international match other than World Cup matches. The holder retains the cup unless the challenger wins the match in normal time.

History
There was a motion from the Georgia Rugby Union just before the 2000 European Nations Cup decider in Tbilisi, to establish a challenge cup along the lines of the Calcutta and Bledisloe Cups to be annually played for between the Oaks and the Lelos.

It was decided that the cup should be named after Antimoz Iverieli (Georgian version) – Antim Ivireanul (Romanian version) (c. 1650–1716). The Rugby Supporters' League (RML) of Georgia approached the Catholicos-Patriarch of All Georgia, Ilia II through influential go-betweens and received his blessing for the use of the name 'Antim'.

The trophy was made by Georgian sculptor and former rugby union player Gia Japaridze, who cast the cup in gilded bronze.

The current holder is Georgia, who defeated Romania 31–7 on 4 March 2023 in Tbilisi.

Previous winners

Summary

Honours
  (16): 2005, 2007, 2008, 2009, 2011, 2012, 2013, 2014, 2015, 2016, 2018, 2019, 2020, 2021, 2022, 2023
  (6): 2002, 2003, 2004, 2006, 2010, 2017

See also
 History of rugby union matches between Georgia and Romania
 Kiseleff Cup

References

External links
 Trophies from rugbyfootballhistory.com
 

Georgia national rugby union team
Romania national rugby union team
Georgia (country)–Romania relations
Rugby union international rivalry trophies
International rugby union competitions hosted by Georgia (country)
International rugby union competitions hosted by Romania
2002 establishments in Romania
2002 establishments in Georgia (country)